Maria Assunta Chiummariello (born 1 January 1958) is a former Italian shot putter three-time national champion at senior level.

Career
As of 13 March 2021 her 17.74 m in the shot put established in 1986, still represents the eighth best Italian all-time performance.

National titles
Chiummariello won three national championships.
 Italian Athletics Championships
 Shot put: 1984, 1986, 1987

Personal bests
Outdoor
Shot put: 17.74 m ( Imola, 12 October 1986)

See also
Italian all-time lists - Shot put

References

1958 births
Italian female shot putters
Living people
People from Palmanova
Sportspeople from Udine
20th-century Italian women
21st-century Italian women